The London Naval Treaty, officially the Treaty for the Limitation and Reduction of Naval Armament, was an agreement between the United Kingdom, Japan, France, Italy, and the United States that was signed on 22 April 1930. Seeking to address issues not covered in the 1922 Washington Naval Treaty, which had created tonnage limits for each nation's surface warships, the new agreement regulated submarine warfare, further controlled cruisers and destroyers, and limited naval shipbuilding.

Ratifications were exchanged in London on 27 October 1930, and the treaty went into effect on the same day, but it was largely ineffective.

The treaty was registered in League of Nations Treaty Series on 6 February 1931.

Conference

The signing of the treaty remains inextricably intertwined with the ongoing negotiations, which began before the official start of the London Naval Conference of 1930, evolved throughout the progress of the official conference schedule, and continued for years afterward.

Terms
The treaty was seen as an extension of the conditions agreed in the Washington Naval Treaty, an effort to prevent a naval arms race after World War I.

The conference was a revival of the efforts that had gone into the 1927 Geneva Naval Conference at which the various negotiators had been unable to reach agreement because of bad feelings between the British and the American governments. The problem may have initially arisen from discussions held between US President President Herbert Hoover and UK Prime Minister Ramsay MacDonald at Rapidan Camp in 1929, but a range of factors affected tensions, which were exacerbated by the other nations at the conference.

Under the treaty, the standard displacement of submarines was restricted to 2,000 tons, with each major power being allowed to keep three submarines of up to 2,800 tons except that France was allowed to keep one. That put an end to the 'big-gun' submarine concept pioneered by the British M class and the French Surcouf.

The number of heavy cruisers was limited: Britain was permitted 15 with a total tonnage of 147,000, the Americans 18 totalling 180,000, and the Japanese 12 totalling 108,000 tons. For light cruisers, no numbers were specified but tonnage limits were 143,500 tons for the Americans, 192,200 tons for the British, and 100,450 tons for the Japanese.

The Americans and the British were permitted up to 150,000 tons and Japan 105,500 tons.

Article 22 relating to submarine warfare declared international law applied to them as to surface vessels. Also, merchant vessels that demonstrated "persistent refusal to stop" or "active resistance" could be sunk without the ship's crew and passengers being first delivered to a "place of safety."

Article 8 outlined smaller surface combatants. The maximum specifications were designed around the French Bougainville-class avisos, which were in construction at the time.

Warships under 600 tons were also completely exempt. That led to creative attempts to use the unlimited nature of the exemption with the Italian Spica-class torpedo boats, Japanese Chidori-class torpedo boats, French La Melpomène-class torpedo boats and British Kingfisher-class sloops.

Aftermath
The next phase of attempted naval arms control was the Second Geneva Naval Conference in 1932. That year, Italy "retired" two battleships, twelve cruisers, 25 destroyers and 12 submarines; in all, 130,000 tons of naval vessels were scrapped or put into reserve. Active negotiations among the other treaty signatories continued during the following years.

That was followed by the Second London Naval Treaty of 1936.

See also
Treaty for the Limitation of Naval Armament
Washington Naval Treaty
Second London Naval Treaty – List of treaties signed in London.
Treaty of London – List of treaties signed in London.
May 15 Incident – attempted coup in Japan

Notes

Further reading
 
 Dingman, Roger. Power in the Pacific: The Origins of Naval Arms Limitation, 1914–1922 (1976)
 Goldstein, Erik, and John H. Maurer, eds. The Washington Conference, 1921–22: Naval Rivalry, East Asian Stability and the Road to Pearl Harbor (Taylor & Francis, 1994).
 Maurer, John, and Christopher Bell, eds. At the Crossroads between Peace and War: The London Naval Conference in 1930 (Naval Institute Press, 2014).
 Redford, Duncan. "Collective Security and Internal Dissent: The Navy League's Attempts to Develop a New Policy towards British Naval Power between 1919 and the 1922 Washington Naval Treaty." History 96.321 (2011): 48-67.
 Roskill, Stephen. Naval Policy Between Wars. Volume I: The Period of Anglo-American Antagonism 1919–1929 (Seaforth Publishing, 2016).
 Steiner, Zara S. (2005).  The Lights that Failed: European International History 1919–1933. Oxford: Oxford University Press. ;  OCLC 58853793

External links
Text of the treaty

1930 in France
1930 in Italy
1930 in Japan
1930 in London
1930 in the United Kingdom
20th-century military history of the United Kingdom
Arms control treaties
Naval treaties
British defence policymaking
History of the French Navy
History of the Royal Navy
Imperial Japanese Navy
Interwar-period treaties
Japan–United States relations
Naval history of Italy
Naval history of Japan
Treaties concluded in 1930
Treaties of the Empire of Japan
Treaties of the French Third Republic
Treaties of the Kingdom of Italy (1861–1946)
Treaties of the United Kingdom
Treaties of the United States
United States Navy in the 20th century
1930 in military history